The Men's 4x200 Freestyle Relay event at the 10th FINA World Aquatics Championships was swum on July 27, 2001. The heats and finals took place July 27.

Results

Preliminaries

Final

References
9th FINA World Championships 2001 Men 4x200m Freestyle Relay

Swimming at the 2001 World Aquatics Championships